Statistics of the UAE Football League for the 1996–97 UAE Football League.

Overview
It was contested by 10 teams, and Al Wasl FC won the championship.

First stage

Playoff

References
United Arab Emirates - List of final tables (RSSSF)

UAE Pro League seasons
United
1996–97 in Emirati football